Yenice is a small town in Çamoluk district of Giresun Province, Turkey. The  population of Yenice is 819  as of 2013. Comparing  this figure  with the figures of the former years shows a rapid decline in population. The main economic activity is agriculture. Beehiving is another sector.

References

Populated places in Giresun Province
Towns in Turkey
Çamoluk District